This is a list of countries by rail usage. Usage of rail transport may be measured in tonne-kilometres (tkm) or passenger-kilometres (pkm) travelled for freight and passenger transport respectively. This is the number of tonnes or passengers multiplied by the average distance of their journeys in kilometres.

Overview 
Almost 10,000 billion freight tonne-kilometres are travelled around the world. Roughly one quarter of these are travelled in the United States, another quarter in China, and a third in India. Of the 3,000bn passenger-kilometres travelled across the world, 1,346bn and 1,150bn of these are travelled in China and India alone. Thus China and India contribute almost half of world's passenger travels. The average Swiss person travels 2,430 km by train each year, almost 500 more than the average Japanese person (the Japanese having the second-highest average kilometres travelled per passenger in the world).

In 2014, there were around 1 million kilometres of railway in the world (a decrease of 3% compared to 2013). Of this, 350,000 km were in Europe and mainly used for passenger service, 370,000 km were in North America and mainly used for freight, and 230,000 km were in Asia and used for both freight and passenger service. In America and Europe, there are many low cost airlines and motorways which compete with rail for passenger traffic, while Asia has seen a large growth in high-speed rail with 257bn pkm representing 72% of total world high-speed rail passenger traffic.

Passenger rail 
These figures do not include metro railway systems; see Lists of rapid transit systems for metro rail statistics.

Passenger-kilometres of rail transport per year 

Countries with more than five billion passenger-kilometres (pkm) travelled per year. Unless otherwise specified, data come from the Railway Statistics 2015 Report by the International Union of Railways (UIC).

Passengers carried in rail transport per year 
Countries with more than 20 million passengers per year. Unless otherwise specified, data come from the Railway Statistics 2019 Report by the International Union of Railways.

Passenger modal share for rail 
The modal share of railway transport (excluding tram & metro) as compared to other modes of transport, based on Passenger-km.

Passenger rail by passenger-kilometres per capita 

Countries with more than five billion passenger-kilometres travelled per year.

Freight rail

Tonne-kilometres of rail transport per year 

Countries with more than one billion tonne-kilometres (tkm) travelled per year. Unless otherwise specified, data come from the Railway Statistics 2014 Report by the International Union of Railways.

Tonnes carried in rail transport per year 
Countries with more than ten million tonnes carried per year. Unless otherwise specified, data come from the Railway Statistics 2014 Report by the International Union of Railways.

Freight modal share for rail 
The modal share carried by rail of all freight in a given country.

Freight rail by tonne-kilometres per capita

Brief railway statistics by country

See also 

 List of countries by rail transport network size
 Rail transport by country

References 

Usage
Rail usage